The Montreal Science Centre is a science museum in Montreal, Quebec, Canada. It is located on the Quai King-Edward (King Edward Pier) in the Old Port of Montreal. Established in 2000 and originally known as the iSci Centre, the museum changed its name to the Montreal Science Centre in 2002. The museum is managed by the Old Port of Montreal Corporation (a division of the Canada Lands Company, a crown corporation of the Government of Canada). The museum is home to interactive exhibitions on science and technology as well as an IMAX theatre.

See also
Space for Life, a related museum district situated in and adjacent to Montreal's former Olympic Park

References

External links

Science Centre
Science museums in Canada
Museums established in 2000
IMAX venues
Old Montreal
Science centers
2000 establishments in Quebec
Association of Science-Technology Centers member institutions